Feyzabad (also Romanized as Feyẕābād and Faizābād) is a village in Estarabad-e Jonubi Rural District, in the Central District of Gorgan County, Golestan Province, Iran. At the 2006 census, its population was 911, in 211 families.

References 

Populated places in Gorgan County